is an Echizen Railway Mikuni Awara Line railway station located in the city of Sakai, Fukui Prefecture, Japan.

Lines

Station layout
The station consists of one side platform serving a single bi-directional track. There is no station building, but only a shelter on the platform. The station is unstaffed.

Adjacent stations

History
Mizui Station was opened on January 30, 1929. On September 1, 1942 the Keifuku Electric Railway merged with Mikuni Awara Electric Railway. Operations were halted from June 25, 2001. The station reopened on August 10, 2003 as an Echizen Railway station.

Passenger statistics
In fiscal 2015, the station was used by an average of 32 passengers daily (boarding passengers only).

Surrounding area
The station's south side is mostly residential, while the north side is composed mainly of fields.
Fukui Prefecture Sakai Government Building is just to the north of the station

See also
 List of railway stations in Japan

References

External links

  

Railway stations in Fukui Prefecture
Railway stations in Japan opened in 1929
Mikuni Awara Line
Sakai, Fukui